MV Asterix (formerly MS Asterix, MS Amorito, MS Neermoor and MS Cynthia) is a Canadian commercial container ship. It was purchased by Federal Fleet Services as part of Project Resolve, and was later converted into a supply ship for the Royal Canadian Navy (RCN). She is intended to act as an interim replacement between the out of service  and the future . Originally launched in Germany in 2010 as Cynthia, the ship was converted and delivered to the RCN in December 2017 when she will be leased to the navy with a merchant navy crew, complemented by RCN personnel. Asterix will be in Canadian service well into the 2020s.

The ship was owned by Capital Ship Management of Greece and registered in Monrovia, Liberia. The vessel was delivered at Quebec in October 2015 for conversion by a pan-consortium comprising Chantier Davie Canada, Aecon Pictou Shipyard of Pictou, Nova Scotia and NavTech, the conversion designer. The vessel is limited in her deployment to enter dangerous areas due to her lack of weapons systems and ability to survive combat damage.

Construction and career as container ship
The ship was laid down on 21 October 2008 at the Nordic Yards Wismar in Wismar, Germany with the yard number 147. The ship was launched as Cynthia on 27 January 2009 and work was completed on the vessel on 1 May 2010. The ship was renamed Amorito in 2010. That same year the ship was renamed again to Neermoor, operating under an Antigua and Barbuda flag while owned by Briese Schiffahrts GmbH & Co KG. In 2013 the ship was renamed Asterix.

Project Resolve

The ship was selected for the Royal Canadian Navy's Project Resolve, where in conjunction with Davie Shipbuilding of Quebec, a ship would be leased by the RCN and converted for use as a naval auxiliary supply vessel. The work converting the ship was initially to be done partially at the AECON shipyard in Pictou, Nova Scotia before being completed at Davie Shipbuilding in Quebec; instead, the ship was sent directly to Davie Shipbuilding. Pending an official agreement between the shipyard and the Canadian government, the vessel was to be ready by mid-2017. The ship is planned to be under contract with the Royal Canadian Navy until 2021 when the second of the two Protecteur-class support ships (renamed from the Queenston class) would be completed. The ship was reportedly acquired for $20 million.

In September 2015, it was announced that L-3 MAPPS (a subsidiary of L-3 Communications) was selected as partner in the conversion for its Integrated Platform Management System. Hepburn Engineering was chosen to provide new state of the art Replenishment at Sea equipment. OSI Maritime Systems was chosen by Davie Shipyards to install their integrated navigation and tactical system aboard the converted ship.

In November 2015, the Liberal government delayed final approval of the $700 million seven-year deal for two months. On 30 November 2015, the Liberal government reversed that decision and gave final approval for the project, allowing Davie to go ahead with the conversion. , the conversion was ahead of schedule, with 60% of the conversion completed.

On 20 July 2017 Davie Shipbuilding unveiled Asterix in a public ceremony with the traditional breaking of a bottle of champagne. This honour was performed by Pauline Théberge, spouse of J. Michel Doyon, the Lieutenant Governor of Quebec. The vessel was re-launched on 15 October 2017 at Quebec City. Sea trials were scheduled to begin on 16 November in Gaspé Bay. The vessel arrived at Halifax, Nova Scotia on 27 December 2017 to embark naval complement to begin training in January 2018. While shifting position within Halifax Harbour in preparation for a storm, the ship lost power. No damage was done to Asterix and the vessel made it safely to the new position. The vessel completed sea trials and was formally accepted into service with the Royal Canadian Navy in January 2018.

Design

The vessel also has a container bay for protection of the containers while in transit. The ship has a double hull, a feature that the previous Protecteur class did not have and prevented them from operating outside of international waters.

A retractable thruster at the bow was added for additional maneuverability and redundancy. The extra thruster allows for dynamic positioning and improved station-keeping in Asterix.

For mission purposes the ship has rooms for crew and medical/hospital facilities for humanitarian missions, along with humanitarian and disaster relief capabilities. There is an area to treat and process evacuees and survivors; a large medical ward divided into two areas capable of treating up to 60. The ship also provides room for 350 in emergency situations.

Asterix, post-conversion, is able to operate up to eight smaller boats with quick launch and recovery capability. 
Asterix has two aircraft hangars planned for two embarked CH-148 Cyclones, but big enough to hold  CH-147F Chinooks, as well as a landing deck capable of handling the largest helicopters. The ship is crewed by 36 civilian personnel and up to 114 military personnel, with a 67-person detachment specifically aboard for replenishment duties.

Due to the civilian nature of her design, Asterix is limited in her ability to survive damage sustained in combat. The ship also lacks any installed self-defense weapons systems, although there are provisions should the need arise. These two issues prevent the ship from being deployed to hazardous combat areas.

Royal Canadian Navy service
The ship then joined  in the Western Pacific, visiting Da Nang, Vietnam. Calgary and Asterix sailed in the South China Sea and were shadowed by a Chinese naval vessel. Asterix supported Calgary during the frigate's assignment enforcing United Nations resolutions against North Korea. After a year at sea, Asterix and Calgary returned to Canada at CFB Esquimalt on 18 December.

On 6 February 2019,  and Asterix departed Esquimalt for Pacific operations with other nations' navies. On 18 February, a Cyclone helicopter from Regina was attempting to land on Asterix and was damaged in the operation. Asterix and the damaged Cyclone were redirected to Guam to undergo inspection. No damage was reported to Asterix, and following air tests of the repaired Cyclone, both ships resumed their deployment. In March 2019, Regina and Asterix parted ways, with Regina deployed to the Middle East as part of Operation Artemis. The vessel returned to Halifax on 26 August after 500 days at sea performing 197 refueling operations with 40 warships.

In August 2022, it was announced that the Royal Canadian Navy's charter of the ship would be extended for at least a further two years with further options to renew the charter, or to purchase the ship, thereafter. In November 2022, the ship arrived at the Davie Shipyard for a one month maintenance period after which she would return to service.

See also

  – converted tanker that served with the Royal Australian Navy from 2006 to 2021.

References

External links

 Davie met à l’eau le nouveau ravitailleur canadien

 

Fleet of the Royal Canadian Navy
2009 ships